Maurice Delplanck was a Belgian rower. He competed in the men's coxed four event at the 1928 Summer Olympics.

References

Year of birth missing
Year of death missing
Belgian male rowers
Olympic rowers of Belgium
Rowers at the 1928 Summer Olympics
Place of birth missing